Subang is a federal constituency in Petaling District, Selangor, Malaysia, that has been represented in the Dewan Rakyat since 1995.

The federal constituency was created from parts of the Shah Alam constituency in the 1994 redistribution and is mandated to return a single member to the Dewan Rakyat under the first past the post voting system.

Demographics 
https://live.chinapress.com.my/ge15/parliament/Selangor

History

Polling districts
According to the federal gazette issued on 31 October 2022, the Subang constituency is divided into 49 polling districts.

Representation history

Note: 1Noted that in 2018 redelineation exercise this Subang constituency is now shifted south to Subang Jaya city centre from former Kelana Jaya constituency, not Subang, Selangor in Shah Alam where the Subang Skypark located which now renamed as Sungai Buloh.

State constituency

Current state assembly members

Local governments

Election results
 
 

Note: 2Mohd Shahir Mohd Adnan was a candidate of Malaysia National Alliance Party (IKATAN), who had contested under the PAS banner through the Gagasan Sejahtera pact.

References

Selangor federal constituencies